Ugra River may refer to 

Ugra River  (Oka), a river in Russia, tributary of the Oka River 
Ugra River (Trotuș), a river in Romania, tributary of the Trotuş River